What's Her Face may refer to:

What's Her Face (doll), a line of fashion dolls by Mattel
What's-Her-Face, a character from "Teen Girl Squad", a comic strip at the website Homestar Runner
"What's-her-face", a song by Christine and the Queens from Chris
”@whatsher_face33” also known as “WhatsHerFace” A singer-songwriter from Northern Ireland. Debuting with an acoustic cover of Kate Bush, Running up that Hill, renamed “A Deal With God (Running up that Hill)”